Tortelli  is a type of filled pasta traditionally made in the Lombardy, Emilia-Romagna, and Tuscany regions of Italy. It can be found in several shapes, including square (similar to ravioli), semi-circular (similar to agnolini), or twisted into a rounded, hat-like form (similar to cappelletti (pasta)). It can be served with melted butter, bolognese sauce, broth, or other sauces. The same word is also used to describe small, fried pastries filled with jam or cream.

Ricotta tortelli, served with butter and herbs, is a popular dish in Romagna. Other typical dishes include tortelli with pumpkin (common in Mantua, Reggio Emilia, Piacenza, and Cremona) and tortelli di parma (from Parma), with ricotta and herbs, spinach, potatoes, or pumpkin.

Many popular forms of tortelli can be found in Tuscany. Tortello del Melo is typical in Pistoia. Potato torricelli is popular in Arezzo, Florence, and Prato. Maremma is known for an unusually large form of tortelli with ricotta and spinach.

Torricelli, a semi-circular form of tortelli with a filling of meat and herbs (such as thyme), is from the Apuan Alps region ("Torricelli" in the local dialect), particularly Lucca, Versilia, and Garfagnana. It was originally a special meal for Shrove Tuesday, but is now prepared year-round.

References

Sources
 Sourdough Tortelli Piacentini". 

Types of pasta